Howard Clark may refer to:
Howard Clark (bishop) (1903–1983), primate of the Anglican Church of Canada
Howard Franklin Clark (1914–1942), U.S. Navy pilot, twice awarded Distinguished Flying Cross
Howard L. Clark Sr. (1916–2001), former CEO of American Express
Howard Charles Clark (born 1929), Canadian academic
Howard L. Clark Jr., former Chairman and CEO of Shearson Lehman Brothers
Howard Clark (golfer) (born 1954), European Tour and Ryder Cup golfer
Howard Clark (footballer) (born 1968), English footballer
Howard Clark (papermaker), American papermaker, founder of Twin Rocker
Howard Clark (American football) (born 1935), American football player
Howie Clark (born 1974), baseball player

See also
Howard Clark Kee, Professor of Biblical Studies Emeritus at Boston University
Howard Clarke (born 1929), Professor Emeritus of Classics at the University of California, Santa Barbara
John Howard Clark (1830–1878), Australian newspaper editor